Natalie Ann Desselle-Reid (July 12, 1967 – December 7, 2020) was an American actress who performed in several films, including B.A.P.S., Def Jam's How to Be a Player, Set It Off and Cinderella, and the television series Built to Last, For Your Love, and Eve.

Biography

Early life
Desselle-Reid was one of four children born to Thelma Lee (née Sherman; 1945–1999) and Paul Desselle Jr. in Alexandria, Louisiana. Deselle-Reid attended Peabody Magnet High School, graduating in 1985. Deselle-Reid later attended Grambling State University.

Career
At Grambling, Desselle-Reid developed a deep interest in the theatre, and appeared in several productions during her time there. She began her acting career in 1996 when she was in the movie Set it Off. In 1997, she played evil step-sister Minerva in the Disney made-for-television movie Cinderella. Desselle-Reid starred in many films, including Madea's Big Happy Family, and guest starred in Family Matters. She was Janie Egins on Eve for three seasons. She is best known for her role as Mickey in B.A.P.S. and appeared in the 2017 series Ya Killin' Me.

Personal life
Desselle-Reid married Leonard Reid in 2003; they had three children.

Death
Desselle-Reid died due to colon cancer on December 7, 2020, at the age of 53. Numerous celebrities in the entertainment industry paid tribute to Deselle-Reid including Eve, Holly Robinson Peete, Issa Rae, Shannon Kane and Shad "Bow Wow" Moss. Deselle-Reid's B.A.P.S co-star Halle Berry posted a tribute via Instagram saying "Natalie represented actual black women, not what black women are perceived to be. For that she was often underrated, passed over – deprived of the platform she truly deserved. But her light continues to shine through the people who grew up watching her, the people who knew her best and those of us who loved her. I'll love you forever my sweet friend."

Filmography

Film

Television

References

External links
 

1967 births
2020 deaths
Actresses from Louisiana
African-American actresses
American film actresses
American television actresses
Deaths from cancer in the United States
Deaths from colorectal cancer
Grambling State University alumni
Peabody Magnet High School alumni
People from Alexandria, Louisiana
Actresses from Los Angeles
Place of death missing
20th-century American actresses
21st-century American actresses
20th-century African-American women
20th-century African-American people
21st-century African-American women
21st-century African-American people